Minuscule 840 (in the Gregory-Aland numbering), Θε427 (von Soden), is a 13th-century Greek minuscule manuscript of the New Testament on paper. The manuscript is lacunose.

Description 
The codex contains the text of the Gospel of Luke (1:51-22:46), on 125 paper leaves (size ). The text is written in one column per page, 24 lines per page.
It contains a commentary.

Text 
The Greek text of the codex is a representative of the Byzantine text-type. Kurt Aland the Greek text of the codex placed in Category V.
It was not examined by the Claremont Profile Method.

History 

Scrivener and C. R. Gregory dated the manuscript to the 13th century. Currently the manuscript is dated by the INTF to the 13th century.

The manuscript was added to the list of New Testament manuscripts by Scrivener (631e) and Gregory (840e). Gregory saw it in 1886.

Currently the manuscript is housed at the University of Messina (Libr. 100), in Messina.

See also 

 List of New Testament minuscules
 Biblical manuscript
 Textual criticism
 Minuscule 839

References

Further reading

External links 
 

Greek New Testament minuscules
13th-century biblical manuscripts